Pediomelum californicum is a species of flowering plant in the legume family known by the common name California Indian breadroot. It is endemic to California, where it grows in the chaparral and woodlands of the coastal mountain ranges. It is a perennial herb with no stem or a short stem that is mostly underground, leaving the plant at ground level.

External links
Jepson Manual Treatment
USDA Plants Profile
Photo gallery

Psoraleeae
Flora of California
Flora without expected TNC conservation status